The Colombia national under-16 and under-17 basketball team is a national basketball team of Colombia, administered by the Federación Colombiana de Baloncesto.

It represents the country in international under-16 and under-17 (under age 16 and under age 17) basketball competitions.

The team appeared at the 2015 South American U17 Basketball Championship for Men.

See also
Colombia national basketball team
Colombia national under-19 basketball team
Colombia women's national under-17 basketball team

References

External links
 Archived records of Colombia team participations

B
Men's national under-17 basketball teams